Walter Hough, Ph.D. (1859–1935) was an American ethnologist who worked for the Smithsonian Institution.

Life
Hough was born at Morgantown, West Virginia. He was educated at Monongalia Academy, West Virginia Agricultural College, and West Virginia University (A.B., 1883; Ph.D., 1894).  He was employed at the Smithsonian National Museum of Natural History as an assistant (1886–1894), as assistant curator of ethnology (1896–1910), and as curator from 1910 until his death in 1935. Though Hough's work revolved around cataloging the museum's collections, he also spent time doing archaeological field work in the American Southwest. In 1905, Hough unearthed preserved cobs of maize in a cave in New Mexico that helped subsequent archaeologists determine that the Mogollon ethnic group inhabited the area before the Anasazi Puebloans, who were previously considered to be the area's earliest inhabitants.

In 1892, Hough was made Knight of the Order of Isabella when in Madrid as a member of the United States Commission. He was also a member of Dr. J. Walter Fewkes' expedition to Arizona (1896–1897).

Publications
 "Censers and incense of Mexico and Central America"—full online copy at HathiTrust

Family 
Hough married Myrtle Zuck, a botanical collector, of Holbrook, Arizona on the 29 December 29, 1897.

References

External links
 
 
Christy G. Turner, II and Jacqueline A. Turner, "The First Claim for Cannibalism in the Southwest: Walter Hough's 1901 Discovery at Canyon Butte Ruin 3, Northeastern Arizona", American Antiquity, Vol. 57, No. 4 (Oct., 1992), pp. 661–682

1859 births
1935 deaths
American explorers
Smithsonian Institution people
American ethnologists